Ezra USA is a Jewish youth movement founded in 2002. The main activities of Ezra are organized trips, including Birthright trips to Israel and "Shalom World" trips, and educational programs and events.

Goals 

The stated goal of the Ezra is to introduce Jewish youth to, and unite it around, its cultural heritage. Another major goal is to fight the assimilation of the younger Jewish generation in America. Ezra also stimulates Jewish young leadership through seminars and shabbatons, both in connection with its trips and in independent programs and events. As a further means to this end, group leaders ("madrichim") are recruited from former participants of Ezra's programs.

Activities

Birthright Israel trips 
Ezra is one of the official trip organizers for Birthright Israel trips for the US, Germany and the Former Soviet Union states. Trips take place during the winter (December - February) and summer (May - August). Originally, Ezra's trips were particularly geared towards participants from families from the former Soviet Union, but in recent years more participants have come from the general American Jewish youth.

"Shalom World" trips 

"Shalom World" trips are organized from all world branches on a yearly basis to Argentina, China, Eastern Europe, Greece, Panama, Russia, Spain, and South Africa. They strive to show participants especially Jewish historical and cultural sites. , over 15,000 young adults have participated in Ezra trips.

Dmitriy Salita Youth Center 

June 6, 2010 Ezra opened a youth center with support from Ukrainian born Jewish-American boxer Dmitry Salita. Also in attendance were leaders of Israel's political party Yisrael Beiteinu, traditionally representing immigrants from the former Soviet Union, headed by Israeli MP Danny Ayalon.

References

External links 
 Ezra USA
 Ezra World

2002 establishments in the United States
Jewish youth organizations
Organizations established in 2002
Zionism in the United States
Zionist youth movements
Youth organizations based in the United States